The 2013 WGC-HSBC Champions was a golf tournament played from 31 October to 3 November at the Sheshan Golf Club in Shanghai, China. It was the fifth WGC-HSBC Champions tournament, and the fourth of four World Golf Championships events held in the 2013 calendar year.

Dustin Johnson broke the tournament scoring record for his first WGC win; he finished three strokes ahead of runner-up Ian Poulter, the defending champion.

Course

Source:

Field
The following is a list of players who qualified for the 2013 WGC-HSBC Champions. Players who qualify from multiple categories will be listed in the first category in which they are eligible with the other qualifying categories in parentheses next to the player's name.

This was the first WGC event for 11 players: Baek Seuk-hyun, Graham DeLaet, Tommy Fleetwood, Huang Mingjie, Huang Wenyi, Jin Jeong, Masahiro Kawamura, Li Haotong, Jordan Spieth, Peter Uihlein and Jimmy Walker. 

1. Winners of the four major championships and The Players Championship
Jason Dufner (12), Phil Mickelson (3,5,12), Justin Rose (12)
Qualified but did not play: Adam Scott (3,9,12), Tiger Woods (2,3,12)

2. Winners of the previous four World Golf Championships
Ian Poulter (12)
Qualified but did not play: Matt Kuchar (3,12)

3. Winners of the top 20 rated PGA Tour events
Jonas Blixt (12), Ken Duke, Derek Ernst, Brian Gay, Bill Haas (12), Billy Horschel (12), Graeme McDowell (5,12), John Merrick, D. A. Points, Henrik Stenson (8,12), Kevin Streelman (12), Michael Thompson, Boo Weekley (12)
Qualified but did not play: Zach Johnson (12)

4. Top 5 available players from the FedEx Cup points list
Graham DeLaet (12), Dustin Johnson (12), Brandt Snedeker (12), Jordan Spieth (12), Nick Watney (12)
Qualified but did not play: Webb Simpson (12), Steve Stricker (12)

5. Winners of the top 20 rated European Tour events
Thomas Bjørn (12), Grégory Bourdy, Paul Casey, Jamie Donaldson (12), Ernie Els (12), Gonzalo Fernández-Castaño, Tommy Fleetwood, Stephen Gallacher, David Howell, Raphaël Jacquelin, David Lynn (12), Matteo Manassero (10,12), Rory McIlroy (12), Louis Oosthuizen (12), Brett Rumford (10), Chris Wood
Qualified but did not play: Joost Luiten

6. Top 5 available players from the Race to Dubai
Sergio García (10,12), Branden Grace (8,12), Mikko Ilonen, Richard Sterne (8,12), Peter Uihlein
Qualified but did not play: Charl Schwartzel (10,12)

7. Four players - winners of the top Japan Golf Tour events, remainder from Order of Merit
Luke Donald (12), Hiroyuki Fujita, Ryo Ishikawa, Masahiro Kawamura

8. Four players - winners of the top Sunshine Tour events, remainder from Order of Merit
George Coetzee (OoM), Darren Fichardt, Martin Kaymer (12), Jaco van Zyl (OoM)

9. Four players - winners of the top PGA Tour of Australasia events, remainder from Order of Merit
Mark Brown (OoM), Michael Hendry (OoM), Jin Jeong, Daniel Popovic
Qualified but did not play: Peter Senior

10. Six players - winners of the top Asian Tour events, remainder from Order of Merit
Kiradech Aphibarnrat, Baek Seuk-hyun (OoM), Gaganjeet Bhullar (OoM), Scott Hend (OoM), Thongchai Jaidee (OoM), Miguel Ángel Jiménez (12)

11. Six players from China
Huang Mingjie, Huang Wenyi, Li Haotong, Liang Wenchong, Hu Mu, Wu Ashun

12. Any players, not included in above categories, in the top 50 of the OWGR on 14 October 2013
Keegan Bradley, Rickie Fowler, Peter Hanson, Hideki Matsuyama, Francesco Molinari, Ryan Moore, Scott Piercy, Bo Van Pelt, Jimmy Walker, Bubba Watson, Lee Westwood
Qualified but did not play: Jason Day, Jim Furyk, Hunter Mahan

13. Alternates, if needed to fill the field of 78 players
None needed

Winner of 21st ranked PGA Tour event
Winner of 21st ranked European Tour event
Next available player, not otherwise exempt, from OWGR as of 14 October, Race to Dubai as of 14 October, FedEx Cup list, repeating as necessary

Nationalities in the field

Past champions in the field 

As a WGC event (2009–present)

Round summaries

First round
Thursday, 31 October 2013

Second round
Friday, 1 November 2013

Third round
Saturday, 2 November 2013

Final round
Sunday, 3 November 2013

Source:

Scorecard

Cumulative tournament scores, relative to par
Source:

References

External links
Coverage on Asian Tour's official site
Coverage on European Tour's official site
Coverage on PGA Tour's official site

WGC-HSBC Champions
WGC-HSBC Champions
WGC-HSBC Champions
WGC-HSBC Champions
WGC-HSBC Champions